Operation Parindey is a 2020 Indian action film directed by Sanjay Gadhvi, written by Tajas Dhhanraj and produced by Arti Gudal. The movie released on 28 February 2020 starring Amit Sadh and Rahul Dev.

Cast
Amit Sadh as STF Abhinav Mathur
Rahul Dev as Monty Singh
 Aakash Dahiya as Pabbi
 Amit Gaur as Kartar Singh
 Rucha Inamdar as STF Komal  Bhardawaj
Kunal Kumar as Srini 
R Badree as Rajan

References

External links
 

2020 direct-to-video films
2020 films
Films about terrorism in India
Films set in Punjab, India
Films shot in India
Indian crime action films
ZEE5 original films
2020 crime action films